Urban Realm is a planning magazine published in Scotland, with a focus on Scottish issues. The magazine was established as Prospect in 1922 by the Royal Incorporation of Architects in Scotland, and is the oldest architectural magazine in Scotland. It was rebranded as Urban Realm to reflect the wider environment in which architecture operates, covering policy, planning, engineering, and strategic issues, as well as new buildings. It is currently published by Urban Realm Ltd.

Carbuncle Awards
Intermittently from 2000-2015, the magazine promoted the Carbuncle Awards, which were aimed at highlighting poor design and planning in Scotland. The awards comprised the "Plook on the Plinth" award for "most dismal town", the "Pock Mark" award for the worst planning decision, and the "Zit Building" award for Scotland's most disappointing new building. 

In 2005, the magazine published a list of the 100 best modern Scottish buildings.

Coatbridge in North Lanarkshire famously won the Carbuncle Award in 2007.

References

External links
 Urban Realm website

1922 establishments in Scotland
Architecture magazines
Magazines established in 1922
Magazines published in Scotland
Quarterly magazines published in the United Kingdom
Architecture in Scotland
Town and country planning in Scotland
Urban studies and planning magazines